Kumudini Patnaik (b 1945) is an Indian Politician and was elected to the Lok Sabha the lower house of Indian Parliament from Aska, Odisha in 2000 in a bye election  as a member of the Biju Janata Dal. But she was expelled from the Biju Janata Dal and she later joined the Congress but lost the Aska seat to Harihar Swain in 2004 and later quit the Congress and joined the BJP.

References

External links
Official biographical sketch in Parliament of India website

1945 births
Living people
People from Odisha
Odisha politicians
India MPs 1999–2004
Lok Sabha members from Odisha
Place of birth missing (living people)
People from Ganjam district
Indian National Congress politicians